Hysen Hakani (July 28, 1932 – February 7, 2011) was an Albanian film director and screenwriter. Hakani is credited with directing Albania's first short film, Fëmijët e saj, which was released in 1957. Hakani died on February 7, 2011, at the age of 78.

Biography
Hakani studied at the Qemal Stafa High School, in Tirana, Albania.

Filmography
1957 - Fëmijët e saj
1961 - Debatik
1963 - Toka jonë
1966 - Oshëtimë në bregdet
1969 - Njësiti guerril
1972 - Ndërgjegja
1977 - Cirku në fshat
1979 - Mysafiri
1981 - Plaku dhe hasmi
1984 - Lundrimi i parë

References

1932 births
2011 deaths
Albanian film directors
Albanian screenwriters
People from Tirana
Qemal Stafa High School alumni